Sir John Henderson DL JP (12 July 1888 – 28 May 1975) was a Scottish Conservative party politician.

The son of John Henderson and Ellen Shiels, Henderson was educated at the Martyrs' Public School, Glasgow.

He married in 1918, Nessie Brander, of Crosshill, Glasgow, and with her had one son and one daughter. A business man, he was chairman of his own company, J. Henderson, Ltd., Produce Importers, of Glasgow. He was a member of the Glasgow Corporation, from 1926 to 1946 and was also a Justice of the Peace and Police Judge for the City of Glasgow.

Henderson was elected to the House of Commons at a by-election in 1946, as Member of Parliament for Glasgow Cathcart.  He held his seat until he retired from Parliament at the 1964 general election.

In parliament, he served as a Member of Inter-Parliamentary Delegations to Finland, Israel, Austria, West Germany, Belgium and Czechoslovakia. He was Chairman of the Scottish Unionist and National Liberals’ Committee and of the Scottish Fact and Faith Films Society, and President of the International Council for Christian Leadership.

He was knighted in 1964. His wife died in 1971 and, in 1972, he married Margaret Whiteley, a widow. He died on 28 May 1975. His address at the time of his death was Dundrennan, 658, Clarkston Road, Netherlee, Glasgow.

References

External links 
 

1888 births
1975 deaths
Unionist Party (Scotland) MPs
Members of the Parliament of the United Kingdom for Glasgow constituencies
UK MPs 1945–1950
UK MPs 1950–1951
UK MPs 1951–1955
UK MPs 1955–1959
UK MPs 1959–1964
Deputy Lieutenants in Scotland